Carelmapu (lit. from Mapudungun "Green Land") is a port and town at the western end of Chacao Channel, southern Chile. Carelmapu was established by the Spanish in 1602 as San Antonio Ribera de Carelmapu following the Destruction of Seven Cities. In 1643 Carelmapu was sacked and its church vandalized by the Dutch corsair Hendrick Brouwer. On March 6, 1676 Carelmapu received the exhausted survivors of Pascual de Iriarte's expedition to the Strait of Magellan.

Fort system

During colonial times Carelmapu was the site of a small fort system made up of Fuerte de Carelmapu just west of Carelmapu, the sentinel outpost of Astillero and the battery of Coronel. The last two were not located in Carelmapu proper but further east along the northern shores of Chacao Channel. The original Fuerte de Carelmapu was built in wood in 1603. At present remnants of it can be found in a deteriorated state.

References

Populated places in Llanquihue Province
Populated coastal places in Chile
Populated places established in 1602
1602 establishments in the Viceroyalty of Peru
Coasts of Los Lagos Region